Tyrel Dodson (born June 25, 1998) is an American football linebacker for the Buffalo Bills of the National Football League (NFL). He played college football at Texas A&M.

Early life and college career
Dodson grew up in Franklin, Tennessee, raised by his single mother Angela, and was rated a 4-star prospect by 24/7 Sports and Rivals after garnering several awards as a high school senior at Centennial High School. He attended college at Texas A&M University, choosing to play for their college football team over other schools such as Arkansas, Kentucky, Missouri, and others. As a freshman in 2016, Dodson recorded 27 tackles, including 1.5 for a loss, and recorded a fumble recovery as a reserve linebacker. He garnered a team-leading 105 tackles as a sophomore, with 11.0 for a loss and 5.5 quarterback sacks in addition to 3 interceptions and 6 pass breakups. After a strong junior year in which he finished third on the team with 61 tackles, Dodson announced that he would forgo his senior year and declare for the NFL draft.

Professional career
Dodson signed with the Buffalo Bills as an undrafted free agent following the 2019 NFL Draft. Following an incident in Arizona in which he was arrested and accused of domestic violence, Dodson received a six-game suspension after pleading guilty to misdemeanor disorderly conduct charges. He was later waived and re-signed to the practice squad upon finishing his suspension.

Dodson made his first regular season appearance on September 13, 2020, during a 27–17 win over the New York Jets. He entered in place of starting middle linebacker Tremaine Edmunds, who suffered a shoulder injury, and was himself injured later in the game. Dodson recorded his first career sack during the game, taking down Jets quarterback Sam Darnold. With Edmunds out the following week against the Miami Dolphins, Dodson made his first career start. He was placed on injured reserve on October 24, 2020. He was activated on December 12, 2020.

Dodson played in 16 games in the 2021 season and recorded 15 tackles. On February 10, 2022, Dodson signed a one-year contract extension with the Bills.

On March 14, 2023, Dodson signed another one-year contract extension.

Personal life
Dodson was the first alumnus from Centennial High School to make it into the NFL. He hosted a football camp for the school in 2021.

NFL career statistics

Regular season

Postseason

References

External links
Buffalo Bills bio
Texas A&M Aggies bio

1998 births
Living people
American football linebackers
Players of American football from Tennessee
Texas A&M Aggies football players
Buffalo Bills players